Bomba is a comune and town in the province of Chieti in the Abruzzo region of Italy. Silvio Spaventa and Bertrando Spaventa were born in Bomba.

Main sights
Parish church of Santa Maria del Popolo
Sanctuary of San Mauro Abate
Church of San Mauro fuori le mura
Ethnographic Museum
Remains of the urban walls and gates (c. 12th century)
Archaeological site of Monte Pallano, perhaps including remains of the ancient Frentani town of Pallanum (VI century b.C.)

References

Cities and towns in Abruzzo